WCRK (105.7 FM, 1150 AM; "Hometown Radio") is a radio station broadcasting a classic hits music format. Licensed to Morristown, Tennessee, United States, the station is currently owned by Radio Acquisition Corp. and features programming from ABC Radio News / The Vol Network / Tennessee Titans Radio Network.

References

External links

CRK
Classic hits radio stations in the United States
Morristown, Tennessee
Radio stations established in 1974